Korwin may refer to:

 KORWiN, a political party in Poland
 Korwin, Greater Poland Voivodeship
 Korwin coat of arms
 Korwin-Szymanowski family
 Janusz Korwin-Mikke, Polish politician, writer and the founder of the Liberty party
 Alan Korwin, American writer, author and civil- and political-rights activist
 Korwin-Litwicki Urban in Tver, Russia

See also
Corwin (disambiguation)